Carsten Arriens (born 11 April 1969) is a former professional tennis player from Germany.

Career
Arriens played his first tournament on the ATP Tour in 1991, at the Geneva Open, where he upset world number 33 Omar Camporese.

In 1992 he won the Guarujá Open, as a qualifier. It would be his only tour title. He also reached the quarter-finals in Long Island.

At the 1993 French Open, Arriens won his first Grand Slam match, outlasting Thomas Enqvist in five sets. He was then defeated by MaliVai Washington in the second round.
 
He had a quiet year in 1994, with his best result being a quarter-final appearance in the Athens International.

In 1995, while playing New Zealander Brett Steven in the opening round of the French Open, Arriens became the first player in the Open era to be disqualified from the French championships. Upon losing the second set, to level the match at 1–1, the German threw his racquet into the net in frustration, from the baseline. He received a warning from Andreas Egli, the chair umpire, but after retrieving his racquet again hurled it away, this time at his chair. It however struck a linesman on his lower leg and the tournament referee was called, which culminated in Arrien's disqualification.

Also that year, Arriens made the second round of the US Open, with a win over Karol Kučera and then came up against fourth seed Boris Becker, who beat him in straight sets. He made three quarter-finals in the 1995 ATP Tour, at Dubai, Oporto and Scottsdale. In Dubai he defeated world number seven Alberto Berasategui.

He has coached several players including Andreas Beck, Louk Sorensen and Alexander Waske.

He was Team captain of the Germany Davis Cup team from 2013 to 2014.

ATP career finals

Singles: 1 (1 title)

ATP Challenger and ITF Futures finals

Singles: 3 (1–2)

Doubles: 1 (1–0)

Performance timeline

Singles

References

1969 births
Living people
German male tennis players
German tennis coaches
Tennis players from Frankfurt